Kirby: Right Back at Ya!, known in Japan as Kirby of the Stars (星のカービィ Hoshi no Kābī), is an anime series adapted from the video game series of the same title by Masahiro Sakurai. Produced by Studio Sign and directed by Sōji Yoshikawa with Mitsuo Kusakabe, the series was broadcast on TV Tokyo and Chubu-Nippon Broadcasting, from October 6, 2001 to September 27, 2003. It follows the adventures of the titular character Kirby as he fights off monsters to his village's well-being.

Four pieces of theme music were used in the original Japanese version. The first opening theme, titled , is performed by Xiang Qi, who also performed the first ending theme . The second opening and ending themes, used from episode 72 onwards, are  performed by Hiroko Asakawa and  performed by Konishiki Yasokichi. 4Kids Entertainment used original music in their adaptation. The English dub used "Kirby, Kirby, Kirby!", a jazz song written by Norman J. Grossfeld and performed by Ralph Schuckett.

Series overview
{| class="wikitable plainrowheaders" style="text-align:center;"
|-
! colspan="2" rowspan="2" |Season
! rowspan="2" |Episodes
! colspan="4" |Originally aired
|-
! First aired (Japanese)
! Last aired (Japanese)
! First aired (English)
! Last aired (English)
|-
| style="background:#47A936" |
| 1
| 26
| 
| 
| 
| 
|-
| style="background:#f68b21" |
| 2
| 25
| 
| 
| 
| 
|-
| style="background:#73B1B7" |
| 3
| 25
| 
| 
| 
| 
|-
| style="background:#8E00AE" |
| 4
| 24
| 
| 
| 
| 
|-
|}

Episodes

Season 1 (2001-02)

Season 2 (2002)

Season 3 (2002-03)

Season 4 (2003)

Short
An 8-minute short episode was initially released in 2009 via Wii no Ma, exclusively in Japan.  It was then released worldwide via Nintendo Video on Nintendo 3DS in 2012, split into two parts.

References

Kirby (series)
Kirby: Right Back at Ya!